Ángel Rodrigo Carreño Ballesteros (born 29 October 1980) is a Chilean footballer who plays as a central midfielder.

Career

Personal life
He is the father of Luckas Carreño, a professional footballer who is a product of Deportes La Serena youth system. As a curiosity, Luckas scored by first time against the same opponent in the same goal than himself.

He is a renowned fan of metal music.

References

External links
 
 Ángel Carreño at Football-Lineups
 

1980 births
Living people
Footballers from Santiago
Chilean footballers
Chilean expatriate footballers
Club Deportivo Palestino footballers
Puerto Montt footballers
Colo-Colo footballers
Örebro SK players
Deportes La Serena footballers
Ñublense footballers
Club Deportivo Universidad Católica footballers
Unión La Calera footballers
Chilean Primera División players
Superettan players
Primera B de Chile players
Expatriate footballers in Sweden
Chilean expatriate sportspeople in Sweden
Association football midfielders